Baldock railway station serves the town of Baldock in Hertfordshire, England.

History
Opened by the Royston and Hitchin Railway, then run by the Great Northern Railway, it became part of the London and North Eastern Railway during the grouping of 1923. The station then passed on to the Eastern Region of British Railways on nationalisation in 1948.

When sectorisation was introduced in the 1980s, the station was served by Network SouthEast until the privatisation of British Railways.

The station is part of the Thameslink Programme which connects Cambridge to Farringdon, City Thameslink and Blackfriars station via the Great Northern Route.  This project went live in 2018.

Services 
All services at Baldock are operated by Thameslink using  EMUs.

The typical off-peak service in trains per hour is:

On weekends, one of the hourly services between London and Cambridge terminates at Royston. On Sundays, the service between Brighton and Cambridge is reduced to hourly.

References

 
 
 
 Station on navigable O.S. map

External links 

Railway stations in Hertfordshire
DfT Category E stations
Former Great Northern Railway stations
Railway stations in Great Britain opened in 1850
Railway stations served by Govia Thameslink Railway
Baldock